Georges Fages, (24 February 1934 – 8 June 2000) was a French rugby league footballer and coach in the 1950s and 1960s.

He spent most of his sporting career with the Albi club, with which he won the French Championship three times in 1956, 1958 and 1962. 

Thanks to his club level performances, he had 18 caps for the French national team between 1959 and 1964, taking part at the 1960 Rugby League World Cup.

Biography 
Outside the pitch, he worked as shopkeeper.

Honours 

 Team honours :
 French Champion : 1956, 1958 et 1962 (Albi).
 Runner-up at the French Championship : 1960 (Albi).

References

External links 
Georges Fages profile at rugbyleagueproject.com

French rugby league coaches
France national rugby league team players
1934 births
2000 deaths
Racing Club Albi coaches
Racing Club Albi XIII players
French rugby league players
Sportspeople from Albi